A Flat Iron for a Farthing (1872) is a book by Juliana Horatia Ewing (1842-1885) and consists of childhood reminiscences of the only child of a widowed father.  It was one of the author's most popular books.

References

 Humphrey Carpenter and Mari Prichard. Oxford Companion to Children's Literature. Oxford University Press, 1997. 
 Jack Zipes (ed) et al. The Norton Anthology of Children's Literature: The Traditions in English.  W. W. Norton, 2005. 
 Jack Zipes (ed.). The Oxford Encyclopedia of Children's Literature. Volumes 1-4. Oxford University Press, 2006. 
 Victor Watson, The Cambridge Guide to Children's Books in English. Cambridge University Press, 2001. 

1872 British novels
19th-century British children's literature
British children's novels
1870s children's books